The Bloomer Shippers Connecting Railroad (or Boomer Line) , headquartered in Gibson City, Illinois, is a Class III railroad serving agricultural communities in east-central Illinois.

History
In June 1985, the Illinois Central Gulf Railroad (ICG) sold a portion of its circuitous route between Kankakee and Bloomington to a new spin-off railroad company which called itself "The Bloomer Line" (after the ex-Illinois Central Railroad division it had purchased).  Specifically, the Bloomer Line purchased the right-of-way between Herscher and Barnes.  The railroad has since taken the line between Herscher and Kempton and Barnes and Colfax out of service.

At Chatsworth, the Bloomer Line makes a connection with the Toledo, Peoria and Western Railway.  In May 1990, the railroad purchased from the Norfolk and Western Railway its ex-Wabash Railway line from near Risk south to Gibson City.  Connections to N&W successor Norfolk Southern and ICG successor Canadian National Railway are made at Gibson City.

Operations
The Bloomer Line is owned by Alliance Grain Company, which owns the eight grain elevators served by the railroad.  It is primarily a grain transporter, shipping carloads of corn, soybeans and wheat from these silos to the connecting railroads, but also serves several other industries, including a soybean processing plant in Gibson City and a fertilizer distribution facility in Colfax.

Bloomer Line locomotives are painted bright red and labeled in a font which looks very similar to that used on the former Chicago, Burlington and Quincy Railroad.

Locomotive maintenance was conducted at Chatsworth until shops were constructed at Gibson City after that line was purchased.

Locomotive Roster

External links
 Alliance Grain Official Bloomer Line Website]
 Bloomer Line Unofficial Website]
 Bloomer Line Roster

Illinois railroads
Spin-offs of the Illinois Central Gulf Railroad